União do Oeste is a municipality in the state of Santa Catarina in the South region of Brazil. It was created in 1988 by division of the municipality of Coronel Freitas.

See also
List of municipalities in Santa Catarina

References

Municipalities in Santa Catarina (state)